Ksenija Zečević (Ксенија Зечевић; February 16, 1956 in Zadar – November 21, 2006 in Belgrade) was a popular Serbian pianist and composer. She worked on film and theatre music. She worked in Belgrade. She was of Montenegrin and Istrian ancestry.

Filmography
1980 – Days of Dreams
1982 – Daleko nebo
1983 – Timočka buna
1988 – The Bizarre Country
1989 – Atoski vrtovi - preobraženje
1993 – Bolje od bekstva
1997 – Some Birds Can't Fly

External links

Film music (filmovi.com)
Film music (www.balkanmedia.com)
 Domaci Filmovi

Musicians from Zadar
1956 births
2006 deaths
Serbs of Croatia
Serbian film score composers
Serbian pianists
20th-century pianists